Chavangphai is a village in the border town of Moreh, Tengnoupal district, Manipur, India. It is located near Indo-Myanmar boundary. There are around 200 houses and around 5000 population.

PIN code is 795131 and post office is Moreh.

Religion and community 
Most of them are Thadou Kuki community and they are Christian. Thadou Kuki is common language in Chavangphai.

References 

Villages in Tengnoupal district